I Still Believe is the fourth studio album by American R&B artist Lyfe Jennings, released on August 31, 2010 on Asylum Records and Warner Bros. Records.

Background
The album was originally titled Sooner or Later and set to be released in 2009 but was pushed to a 2010 release due to Lyfe wanting more time to make this his best album. Lyfe stated this will be his final album because family issues involving his children but he has said he will still do some behind the scene work and a couple features every so often. Lyfe has also said: "I never compare any of my other albums to 268-192, because they were different – special, but different at the same time. I think this album here is definitely comparable to the first time I really had a couple of different features, dream features that I can do songs with. It's not over yet, this is the last album to finish your collection."

Singles
"Busy", is the first official single from the album, it's produced by Lyfe Jennings and was released on February 23, 2010.
"Statistics", is the second single from the album, it is produced by T-Minus and was released on June 22, 2010. The music video was released on June 14, 2010.

Guests
The guests that were confirmed to be on the album were Bryan-Michael Cox, Warryn Campbell, Fabolous, Bobby V, Ludacris, Anthony Hamilton and Jazmine Sullivan.

Sales and chart performance
The album debuted at #6 on the Billboard 200 with over 36,000 copies sold in the first week released.

Track listing

Charts

Weekly charts

Year-end charts

References

2010 albums
Albums produced by Bryan-Michael Cox
Albums produced by T-Minus (record producer)
Albums produced by Troy Taylor (record producer)
Lyfe Jennings albums